Olinia is a genus of small trees and shrubs with 10 species in the family Penaeaceae. The species of Olinia are native to Africa, ranging from west Africa to South Africa. It was previously regarded as the sole genus in the family Oliniaceae, but is now included in the expanded Penaeaceae along with Rhynchocalyx (formerly of the Rhynchocalycaceae) under the APG III system of classification.

References

External links

Afromontane flora
Penaeaceae
Myrtales genera